Saints and Sinners is a 1916 American drama silent film directed by James Kirkwood, Sr. and written by Hugh Ford and Henry Arthur Jones. The film stars Estar Banks, Hal Forde, Clarence Handyside, Peggy Hyland, William Lampe and Horace Newman. The film was released on May 25, 1916, by Paramount Pictures.

Plot
A man named George loves a preachers daughter, but she doesn't seem to love him back. She brings scandal to her father by spending time with a man with a bad reputation. Eventually the characters in the movie have to deal with a scarlet fever epidemic. The various characters (including a preacher) redeem themselves and George ends up marrying the girl he liked.

Cast 
Estar Banks as Lydia
Hal Forde as Captain Fanshawe
Clarence Handyside as Hoggard
Peggy Hyland as Letty Fletcher
William Lampe as George Kingsmill
Horace Newman as Peter Greenacre
Albert Tavernier as Jacob Fletcher

References

External links 
 

1916 films
1910s English-language films
Silent American drama films
1916 drama films
Paramount Pictures films
Films directed by James Kirkwood Sr.
American black-and-white films
American silent feature films
1910s American films